Neonomius is a genus of beetles in the family Carabidae, containing the following species:

 Neonomius australis (Sloane, 1915)
 Neonomius laevicollis (Sloane, 1915)
 Neonomius laticollis (Sloane, 1900)

References

Psydrinae